Isaac Shooyook is a Canadian Inuk politician from Arctic Bay, Northwest Territories (now Nunavut). He was elected to the Legislative Assembly of Nunavut in the 2013 election. He represented the electoral district of Quttiktuq until his defeat in the 2017 election.

References

Living people
Members of the Legislative Assembly of Nunavut
Inuit from the Northwest Territories
Inuit politicians
People from Arctic Bay
1939 births
21st-century Canadian politicians
Inuit from Nunavut